MetaHorror is an anthology of stories edited by Dennis Etchison. It was published by Dell Abyss in July 1992. The anthology contains, among several other stories, the Peter Straub short story "The Ghost Village", which was original to the anthology and won the 1993 World Fantasy Award for Best Short Story. The anthology itself won the 1993 World Fantasy Award for Best Anthology.

Contents

 Introduction (MetaHorror), by Dennis Etchison
 "Blues and the Abstract Truth", by Barry N. Malzberg and Jack Dann
 "Are You Now?", by Scott Edelman
 "Stab", by Lawrence Watt-Evans
 "Mutilator", by Richard Christian Matheson
 "Martyrdom", by Joyce Carol Oates
 "Briar Rose", by Kim Antieau
 "Replacements", by Lisa Tuttle
 "Ziggles", by Donald R. Burleson
 "End of the Line", by Ramsey Campbell
 "Did They Get You to Trade?", by Karl Edward Wagner
 "GIFCO", by M. John Harrison
 "The Properties of the Beast", by Whitley Strieber
 "In Praise of Folly", by Thomas Tessier
 "The Visit", by William F. Nolan
 "The Ring of Truth", by George Clayton Johnson
 "Nothing Will Hurt You", by David Morrell
 "Underground", by Steve Rasnic Tem
 "Bucky Goes to Church", by Robert Devereaux
 "Dumbarton Oaks", by Barry N. Malzberg
 "Novena", by Chelsea Quinn Yarbro
 "The Ghost Village", by Peter Straub

Reprints
Donald M. Grant, January 1993.

References

1992 anthologies
Horror anthologies